Parkington may refer to:

Ballston Common Mall, Arlington, Virginia, originally named Parkington Shopping Center, one of the first shopping centers in the Washington, D.C., area
Hiram W. Johnson House, Washington, D.C., also known as Parkington, on the National Register of Historic Places
Suzie and Augustus Parkington, main characters of the 1944 film Mrs. Parkington, played by Greer Garson and Walter Pidgeon respectively
Samantha Parkington, a doll in the American Girl line